Kébémer Department is one of the 45 departments of Senegal, and one of the three which make up the Louga Region.

The only commune in the department is Kébémer.

The rural districts (communautés rurales) comprise:
 Arrondissement of Ndande:
 Bandegne Ouolof
 Diokoul Diawrigne
 Kab Gaye
 Ndande
 Thieppe
 Arrondissement of Darou Mousty:
 Mbacké Cajor
 Darou Marnane
 Darou Mousty
 Mbadiane
 Ndoyene
 Sam Yabal
 Touba Mérina
 Arrondissement of Sagatta Gueth:
 Ngourane Ouolof
 Thiolom Fall
 Sagatta Gueth
 Kanène Ndiob
 Loro

Historic sites
 Ndande railway station
 Wells of Kalom at Ndande
 Tomb of Kocc Barma Fall at Ndiongué Fall, Ndande district
 Dékheulé battlefield
 Loro battlefield
 Kébémer quay

References

Departments of Senegal
Louga Region